Barah Nagarpalika previously Mahendranagar is a municipality in Sunsari District in the Kosi Zone of south-eastern Nepal. It is situated near the Koshi River. Most of the residents, as is common in Nepal, depend on agriculture but in the last few years the trend of going to the Persian Gulf region as workers is increasing.  The town is yet to have any prominent business houses but is a growing market with a number of small industries, hotels and shops. Being linked with some major cities, Dharan & Itahari  of the Sunsari District, this town holds a very good chance of development. There is one community radio station also, named Sunsari FM.

There are a number of schools and a higher secondary school in the town and almost all the children go to primary school and higher school. The fraction of students continuing their studies to higher level is low because of the low economic status of the people. The municipality was previously named Mahendranagar after late king Mahendra.

Most of the residents are Hindu but there is also a small area of Islamic people in the village. The village is rich in temples and there is also a mosque and a church.

At the time of the 2011 Nepal census it had a population of 85,237.

Climate
The weather in Barah Municipality is mostly hot.
Chakraghatti Pulaha experiences 6 seasons,

References

Populated places in Sunsari District